Lieutenant General Alonzo Patrick Fox (November 11, 1895 – December 19, 1984) was a United States Army officer. He was prominent in the 1950s as a military advisor to the Assistant Secretary of Defense for International Security Affairs and as Deputy Assistant Secretary of Defense for National Security Council Affairs following his retirement from the Army. General Fox was also the father-in-law of Alexander Haig.

Early life
"Pat" Fox was born on November 11, 1895, in St. Louis, Missouri.  He graduated from St. Louis University in 1917.

Military career

World War I
He was commissioned as a second lieutenant of infantry. During World War I, he was stationed at Camp Funston, Kansas.

Interwar years

In 1921 Fox graduated from the Infantry School Basic Course. Fox served in the Philippines from 1923 to 1924 and Hawaii from 1932 to 1935. In 1932, Fox graduated from the Infantry School Advanced Course. In the mid-1930s Fox served as an assistant professor of military science for the Reserve Officer Training Corps program at the University of Maine at Orono. Fox graduated from the Army Command and General Staff College in 1938. From 1938 to 1942, Fox served as an instructor at the Fort Benning Infantry School.

World War II
When the U.S. entered World War II, Fox was promoted to brigadier general and in 1943 became assistant division commander of the 102nd Infantry Division, serving with the division through campaigns in northern France, the Rhineland and Central Europe.

Post-World War II
From 1945 to 1946, Fox served as commander of the War Department Personnel Center at Fort Sam Houston, Texas, where he was responsible for the demobilization and discharge of soldiers returning from World War II.

In 1946, Fox was appointed as a deputy chief of staff of the Supreme Command Allied Powers in Japan.

Korean War
When the United Nations Command was formed during the Korean War, Fox was named one of its deputy chiefs of staff. Fox participated in the Inchon landing in September 1950 and received the Silver Star.

Post Korean War
The following year, Fox was named the Army's member of the Joint Strategic Survey Committee, a senior advisory group of the Joint Chiefs of Staff. From 1954 to 1955, Fox served as chief of staff for Allied Forces in Southern Europe. Fox served as military adviser to the Assistant Secretary of Defense for International Security Affairs from 1955 to 1957.

Fox retired from the Army in 1957.

Awards
His decorations included multiple awards of the Distinguished Service Medal, the Silver Star, the Legion of Merit, and three Bronze Stars.

Post-military work

From 1957 to 1959, Fox served as Deputy Assistant Secretary of Defense for National Security Council Affairs.

In retirement, Fox resided in McLean, Virginia.

Death and burial
He died at Sibley Memorial Hospital in Washington, D.C., on December 19, 1984. He was buried at Arlington National Cemetery, Section 2, Site 4735-G RH.

Personal life
Fox was married to Elizabeth Jordan (October 7, 1900 – February 20, 1964).  Their children included a son, Army Colonel Eugene A. Fox, and a daughter, Patricia Fox.  Patricia Fox was the wife of Alexander M. Haig Jr.

References

External links
Generals of World War II

1895 births
1984 deaths
United States Army personnel of the Korean War
United States Army Command and General Staff College alumni
Recipients of the Distinguished Service Medal (US Army)
Recipients of the Silver Star
Recipients of the Legion of Merit
Military personnel from St. Louis
United States Department of Defense officials
People from McLean, Virginia
Saint Louis University alumni
Burials at Arlington National Cemetery
United States Army personnel of World War I
United States Army generals of World War II
United States Army generals
United States Army Infantry Branch personnel